My God is a 2015 Malayalam film directed by M. Mohanan, starring Suresh Gopi, Manoj Guinness, Sreenivasan, Honey Rose, Lena, Joy Mathew and Master Adarsh in prominent roles. The songs and background score were composed by Bijibal. The film was released on 4 December 2015.

Plot 
The movie narrates the resulting events in the life of Sam. Sam Thottunkal, the younger son of Thomas Scaria and Zareena is a teenager, is an introvert. It is when Sam's life becomes more and more complicated, he gets acquainted with Adiraja. Movie narrates the resulting events in the life of Sam.

Cast 
 Suresh Gopi  as Adiraja Bhattadiri
 Honey Rose Dr. Arathi Bhattathiripadu
 Manoj Guinness as Chacko
 Sreenivasan 
 Lena
 Joy Mathew
 Master Adarsh as Sam Thottunkal
 Indrans
 Sreejith Ravi
 Praveen Prem
 Chali Pala
 Kalabhavan Haneef
 Abhi Madhav

References

External links 
 

2010s Malayalam-language films
2015 films